Flagstaff High School (FHS) is a secondary school in Flagstaff, Arizona. Flagstaff High School has been opened to the public since 1923. FHS is a four-year public high school of approximately 1,500 students. The students are primarily of five ethnic groups:  White, Native American, Hispanic, Asian, and African-American. Approximately 50 percent of the students are minorities; 147 are from various Native American tribes and live at the Bureau of Indian Affairs KinLani Dormitory. The student body represents a broad socio-economic range from low income to upper middle class. Each year approximately 50 percent of the graduates enroll in four-year colleges and universities and 25 percent in two-year institutions.

Attendance boundary and supplementary dormitory
In addition to sections of Flagstaff, the school serves sections of the Navajo Reservation: Birdsprings, Leupp, and Tolani Lake.

There is a tribally-controlled dormitory facility contracting with the Bureau of Indian Education (BIE), Flagstaff Bordertown Dormitory, which houses Native American students who attend Flagstaff High.

Notable alumni
 Bruce Babbitt, 16th Governor of Arizona and US Secretary of the Interior during the Bill Clinton administration.
 Clifford Beck, Jr. (1946–1995), Navajo painter and illustrator.
 George Grantham (1900–1954), MLB player (Chicago Cubs, Pittsburgh Pirates, Cincinnati Reds, New York Giants)
 Yaotzin Meza, Arizona State Wrestling All-American and MMA fighter with the UFC.
  Michael Slobodchikoff, Political Science Professor and Media Analyst.

References

Public high schools in Arizona
Educational institutions established in 1923
Schools in Coconino County, Arizona
1923 establishments in Arizona